Nobs or NOBS may refer to:
 The Nobs, an English rock music group
 NOBS, sodium nonanoyloxybenzenesulfonate, an ingredient in cleaning products
 Nobs (surname), a family name common in Switzerland

See also 
 Nob (disambiguation)